The Pskov Oblast Assembly of Deputies is the regional parliament of Pskov Oblast, a federal subject of Russia.

The Assembly of Deputies consists of 26 seats. It had previously consisted of 44 seats, prior to the 2021 elections. Deputies are elected by the citizens of Pskov Oblast. Since 2002, the Assembly of Deputies has been elected using parallel voting.

Elections

2016
Elections to the Pskov Oblast Assembly of Deputies were held on 18 September 2016, as part of the Russian regional elections.

Half of the seats (22) were elected through first-past-the-post and half (22) through proportional representation with a 5% electoral threshold.

2021

References 

Legislatures of the federal subjects of Russia
Politics of Pskov Oblast
1993 establishments in Russia